Gilbert Barrette (born May 29, 1941) is a Canadian politician.

He was a member of the Liberal Party of Canada in the House of Commons of Canada, representing the riding of Témiscamingue since 2003, where he won in a by-election. He lost the seat in the 2004 election to Bloc Québécois candidate Marc Lemay.

Barrette is a former school administrator.

References

External links

1941 births
Living people
Liberal Party of Canada MPs
Members of the House of Commons of Canada from Quebec
21st-century Canadian politicians